Vampire Science is the second novel in the BBC Books series, the Eighth Doctor Adventures, based upon the BBC's long-running science fiction television series, Doctor Who.  It was written by Jonathan Blum and Kate Orman.

Synopsis
An ancient Time Lord enemy, 'vampires', have been spotted on earth. Some of these creatures want to co-exist with humanity, but others want to cause destruction.

See also
Vampire (Doctor Who)

Notes
The book was originally intended to feature the character of Grace Holloway from the 1996 Doctor Who television movie, but late in the day the authors were told that rights to the character were not available. The role was changed to that of Carolyn in the final novel.

The character of General Kramer previously appeared in a fan film that starred Jon Blum as The Doctor.

References are made to the Seventh Doctor and Ace.

External links
The Cloister Library - Vampire Science 
The Whoniverse - Discontinuity Guide entry for Vampire Science

Reviews
The Whoniverse's review of Vampire Science 
Zealot Script's review on Vampire Science

1997 British novels
1997 science fiction novels
Eighth Doctor Adventures
Novels by Kate Orman
Novels by Jonathan Blum
Vampire novels